Fabian "Fabs" Coulthard (born 28 July 1982) is a British-born New Zealand professional race car driver, currently competing in the Repco Supercars Championship, driving as an endurance co-driver for Chaz Mostert with Walkinshaw Andretti United. Fabian is a second cousin of former Formula One driver David Coulthard.

Early career
Coulthard was born in Burnley, England but raised in Auckland, New Zealand. He started his career in karts before moving into Formula Ford. He competed in the Formula Ford support races at the 2002 Australian Grand Prix, winning the Alan Jones Trophy with two wins and a second place in the three races. Coulthard also won the 2001/2002 New Zealand Formula Ford Championship. In the United Kingdom, Coulthard competed in British Formula Renault, where he was teammates with future Formula One world champion Lewis Hamilton. With his budget exhausted, Coulthard returned to Australia to race in the Australian Carrera Cup Championship, finishing third and best rookie in 2004 and winning the title in 2005.

Supercars Championship
In 2006 Coulthard signed to drive with Paul Morris Motorsport, he shared a car with Alan Gurr and Steve Ellery. Coulthard returned to drive the older model VZ Commodore for the same team in 2007, before stepping out after Bathurst to concentrate on his 2008 plans.

Paul Cruickshank Racing

Coulthard enjoyed a breakout season in 2008 driving for Paul Cruickshank Racing. Driving a Ford Falcon (BF), Coulthard finished in the top ten on six separate occasions, including fifth place on home soil in Hamilton, New Zealand and finishing the season in a respectable 13th in the championship.

In 2009 he returned with PCR, driving a brand new Ford Falcon (FG) having another consistent year behind the wheel of the Falcon. At Symmons Plains Raceway Coulthard broke through for his first podium result in V8 Supercars, finishing third at the 2009 Falken Tasmania Challenge and finished the season in another consistent 16th in the championship.

Walkinshaw Racing

In 2010 he joined Walkinshaw Racing, the same operation as the famous Holden Racing Team. On the first lap of the 2010 Supercheap Auto Bathurst 1000, his left-rear tyre blew after earlier contact, spun at 280 km/h through The Chase and rolled six times in the sand-trap before coming to a stop. Coulthard has failed to replicate his 2008/2009 speed with only three respectable results being a seventh in race 5 of the championship, at the 2010 Clipsal 500 an eighth at 2010 Falken Tasmania Challenge and another 5th at the Sydney Telstra 500.

In 2011, Coulthard continued racing with Walkinshaw Racing, driving the No. 61 Bundaberg Racing Team VE Commodore.

Brad Jones Racing

In 2012, he left Walkinshaw Racing and moved to Brad Jones Racing. Coulthard won his first V8 Supercars race at the Symmons Plains event in 2013, he went on to win a further two races and scored nine podium finishes that year. He finished the year in sixth Place. 
2014 was not quite as successful for Coulthard, with only one race win and five podiums on the way to 8th in the Championship. 
In 2015, Coulthard opened the year strong, with a podium in the first race at the Clipsal 500 and a win in the second. He went on to score another seven podiums in the year, placing seventh in the championship.

DJR Team Penske
Coulthard left Brad Jones Racing at the end of the 2015 season to sign with DJR Team Penske, returning to a two-car squad after running only a single car in 2015. He went on to place 12th in the championship. In 2017 he won 4 races en route to a career best 3rd in the championship

Career results

Career summary

Complete Bathurst 1000 results

Supercars Championship results
(key) (Races in bold indicate pole position) (Races in italics indicate fastest lap)

Complete Porsche Supercup results
(key) (Races in bold indicate pole position) (Races in italics indicate fastest lap)

See also
List of sportspeople with dual nationality

References

 REC on the market

External links
 
 V8 Supercars Official Profile
 Driver Database profile
 Profile on Racing Reference
 NMD
 V8 X article
 Speedsport 
 Conrod Bio

Supercars Championship drivers
German Formula Renault 2.0 drivers
British Formula Renault 2.0 drivers
English racing drivers
New Zealand racing drivers
1982 births
Living people
Formula Ford drivers
Sportspeople from Burnley
Sportspeople from Auckland
Naturalised citizens of New Zealand
New Zealand people of Scottish descent
Porsche Supercup drivers
V8SuperTourer drivers
People educated at Rangitoto College
Manor Motorsport drivers
Team Penske drivers
Dick Johnson Racing drivers
Andretti Autosport drivers
United Autosports drivers